WCVT (101.7 FM) is a radio station broadcasting a classic hits format, branded as "101.7 WCVT Classic Hits Vermont". Licensed to Stowe, Vermont, United States, the station serves Northern Vermont including the Burlington-Plattsburgh market, along with the Montpelier-Saint Johnsbury market.  It is owned by the Radio Vermont Group, controlled by NASCAR broadcaster Ken Squier.

History
The station went on the air as WRFB on February 28, 1976, and became WVMX on October 28, 1990. On July 2, 1997, the station changed its call sign to the current WCVT. When the station's call sign changed, its format did as well, and it began airing classical music. In June 2014, Radio Vermont announced that WCVT would drop the classical format in July, citing the growth of the noncommercial VPR Classical network. The station launched a full service classic hits music format branded as "101 The One" on July 1; the new format features what Ken Squier described as "a new adult service local to Vermont."

On September 28, 2020, the station re-branded as "101.7 WCVT Classic Hits Vermont", while retaining a deep library classic hits format.

Translator

References

External links

CVT
Radio stations established in 1976
1976 establishments in Vermont
Classic hits radio stations in the United States